Davidsson is a Swedish patronymic surname meaning "son of David". Notable people with the surname include:

Daniel Davidsson (born 1983), speedway rider racing for the Poole Pirates
Elias Davidsson (1941–2022), Icelandic composer and author
Hans Davidsson (born 1958), Swedish organist and teacher
Johan Davidsson (born 1976), Swedish professional ice hockey player
Jonas Davidsson (born 1984), Swedish speedway rider and current member of Swedish national team
Jonathan Davidsson (born 1997), Swedish professional ice hockey player
Marcus Davidsson (born 1998), Swedish professional ice hockey player

See also
11798 Davidsson, main-belt asteroid

Swedish-language surnames
Patronymic surnames
Surnames from given names